Middenbeemster is a town in the Dutch province of North Holland. It is a part of the former municipality of Beemster, and lies about 6 km northwest of Purmerend. Since 2022 it has been part of the municipality of Purmerend.

In 2001, the town of Middenbeemster had 3628 inhabitants. The built-up area of the town was 0.82 km², and contained 1404 residences. The slightly larger statistical area "Middenbeemster" has a population of around 3820. The town is the birthplace of the painter Carel Fabritius.

Notable residents
Francien de Zeeuw
Carel Fabritius

References

Populated places in North Holland
Geography of Purmerend